Rocío Boliver is a Mexican performance artist who creates body art about gender, sexuality, pain and pleasure. In 1992, Boliver began her career as a performance artist reading her porno-erotic writings. Boliver has a background in video and Mexican theatre. From 1994 to 2007 she worked in theatre projects, performance and contemporary art, collaborating with the playwright Juan José Gurrola . Boliver has performed at a variety of venues such as museums, raves, universities, galleries, activist meetings and TV programs. An underground cultural icon in Mexico, Boliver is part of a Goth-art scene, and has presented works at alternative forums such as the Sadomasochism National Festival. Boliver's work has presented in North America, South America, Europe and Asia.

Biography
Rocío Boliver was born in Mexico City in 1956. Boliver studied dance and philosophy. In 1992, Boliver began reading her porno-erotic texts, which focus on sexually repressive ideologies towards Mexican women. From 1998 to 2008 Boliver collaborated with an electropanic music ensemble called Binaria, combining sound art and performance art. Boliver studied performance art at the Tisch School for the Arts, New York University with Richard Schechner, and history of performance in Arts Plastiques du Cégep de l'Abitibi, Quebec, Canada. In 2002, Boliver published her first book Saber Escoger. Boliver contributes writings to alternative sexual magazines and regularly lectures.

Career
Boliver has exhibited works in the museums Ex Teresa Arte Actual (INBA) and El Museo Experimental El Eco (UNAM). Boliver has been awarded the 2013 National System of Creators scholarship from FONCA, CONACULTA; the 2010 Residence Fellowship, Ladines, Art Research Center, Government of the Principality of Asturias, Spain; and finally the 2008 Scholarship support through Cultural and Joint Investment Projects FONCA-The National Council for Culture and the Arts, Project Sweet sixteen and still virgin, retrospective exhibition. Boliver teaches performance art workshops in Lisbon, New York, Barcelona and Mexico City.

References

1956 births
Living people
Mexican performance artists
Mexican women artists
Mexican erotic artists
Body art
Artists from Mexico City